Akhmetabad may refer to:
 Akhmetabad, Ardabil
 Akhmetabad, East Azerbaijan
 Akhmetabad, Qazvin

See also
 Ahmadabad (disambiguation)